Germijan is a village in the municipality of Novaci, North Macedonia. It used to be part of the former municipality of Bač. It is located close to the Greek border.

Demographics
According to the 2002 census, the village had a total of 257 inhabitants. Ethnic groups in the village include:

Macedonians 251
Serbs 5
Others 1

References

Villages in Novaci Municipality